Per Ove Lennart Nilsson (17 August 1918 in Välluv, Sweden — 17 January 2010) is a former Swedish football goalkeeper. He made 109 Allsvenskan appearances for Djurgårdens IF.

References

Swedish footballers
Djurgårdens IF Fotboll players
1918 births
2010 deaths
Spånga IS players

Association football goalkeepers